Daniel Morrison may refer to:

 Dan Morrison (sailor) (born 1931), sailor for the United States Virgin Islands
 Dan Morrison (umpire) (born 1948), umpire in Major League Baseball
 Dan Morrison (wrestler) (born 1974), American professional wrestler
 Daniel Morrison (dancer), dancer with the Royal New Zealand Ballet
 Danny Morrison (cricketer) (born 1966), New Zealand cricketer
 Danny Morrison (Irish republican) (born 1953), Irish republican writer and activist
 Danny Morrison (sports executive), president of the Carolina Panthers
 Daniel Morrison, actor who played Chris Sharpe in Degrassi: The Next Generation